Agonopterix conterminella is a moth of the family Depressariidae which is found in Asia, Europe and North America. It was described by Philipp Christoph Zeller in 1839 from a specimen found in Augsburg, Germany. The larvae feed on the terminal shoots of willows.

Imago
The wingspan is 18–21 mm. 
The head and thorax are pale ochreous-yellowish, patagia brownish. Forewings crimson fuscous, disc suffused with fuscous, more or less mixed with dark fuscous, with some yellow-whitish scales, sometimes forming spots on costa; base yellow-whitish, enclosing a dark dorsal mark; first discal stigma forming an oblique curved black mark, sometimes followed by yellow-whitish scales, second yellow-whitish. Hindwings whitish-fuscous. The larva is light green; dots black; head yellow-brownish

Adults are on wing from June to September, fly at night and come to light.

Ova
Eggs are laid on willows (Salix species). Known species include white willow ([[Salix alba|S. alba]]), eared willow (S. aurita), goat willow (S. caprea). grey willow (S. cinerea), crack willow (S. fragilis), creeping willow (S. repens) almond willow (S. triandra) and osier (S. viminalis).

Larva
The head of the larva is yellowish-brown and the body is pale green and the prothoracic plate is pale green. They feed on the terminal shoots of Salix'' species in May and June.

Pupa
In a cocoon in detritus or earth in June and July.

Distribution
It is found in most of Europe, except the Iberian Peninsula and most of the Balkan Peninsula. The range extends to Japan. The species was recently reported from North America, with records from British Columbia and Ontario.

References

External links
 UKmoths
 lepiforum.de

Agonopterix
Moths described in 1839
Moths of Asia
Moths of Europe
Moths of North America
Taxa named by Philipp Christoph Zeller